Peter Lockyer is an American actor and tenor. He was born in Poughkeepsie, New York. As a child, he split his time between Toronto and Connecticut, and went to the same high school as the actress Gretchen Mol. Lockyer has appeared in numerous productions, including Miss Saigon as Chris, Les Misérables as Marius and La Boheme as a Rodolfo understudy on Broadway. He has also appeared in a national tour of The Phantom of the Opera and on TV with Bette Midler in a 1993 adaption of Gypsy.

After a break in performing, during which he earned dual master's degrees, qualifying him to teach in New York City, Lockyer returned to acting for the European tour of Barbra Streisand's Broadway Boys. He has also performed in 42nd Street in Europe and Les Misérables in China and South Korea. Recently, Lockyer returned to his native Connecticut to play the role of Tom in The Glass Menagerie at the historical Ivoryton Playhouse. He is playing Jean Valjean in Les Misérables in the current national tour. Years before he played the role in a Hawaiian production of Les Misérables, which he directed himself. He played Jean Valjean in Les Misérables in the US 25th anniversary tour and in 2015 at the Queen's Theatre in London's West End in the UK. In 2019, Lockyer played the role of Billy Flynn in Chicago on Broadway.

References

Year of birth missing (living people)
Living people
American male musical theatre actors